Durham Downs may refer to:

 Durham Downs, Queensland, a locality in the Maranoa Region, Australia
 Durham Downs Station, a cattle farm in the Shire of Bullo, Queensland, Australia